Pterostylis squamata, commonly known as the southern rustyhood or ruddyhood, is a plant in the orchid family Orchidaceae and is endemic to south-eastern Australia. Flowering plants have up to ten translucent green flowers with reddish-brown markings and a hairy, insect-like labellum. Non-flowering plants have a rosette of four to eight egg-shaped leaves. This species is very similar to Pterostylis rufa which has a narrower labellum and other minor differences.

Description
Pterostylis squamata, is a terrestrial,  perennial, deciduous, herb with an underground tuber. There are between two and six stem leaves wrapped around the flowering spike. There are five to seven hairs up to on each side of the labellum and many shorter hairs on the "head" end. Flowering occurs from October to March.

Taxonomy and naming
Pterostylis squamata was first formally described in 1810 by Robert Brown and the description was published in the Prodromus Florae Novae Hollandiae et Insulae Van Diemen. The specific epithet (squamata) is a Latin word meaning "scaly".

Distribution and habitat
The southern rustyhood grows in heath, woodland and forest, often near rock outcrops south from the Brindabella Range in New South Wales and the Australian Capital Territory, scattered across Victoria and widespread in Tasmania.

References

squamata
Endemic orchids of Australia
Orchids of the Australian Capital Territory
Orchids of New South Wales
Orchids of Victoria (Australia)
Orchids of Tasmania
Plants described in 1810